Lamprosema alphalis is a species of moth of the family Crambidae described by Pierre Viette in 1958. It can be found in Madagascar.

Its wingspan is 17–18 mm, with a length of the forewings of 8-8.5 mm.

This species looks close to Dichocrocis alluaudalis but is considerably smaller. The holotype had been collected in western Madagascar, 45 km south of Morondava

References 

Lamprosema
Moths of Madagascar
Moths of Africa
Moths described in 1958